The 1980–81 Princeton Tigers men's basketball team represented Princeton University in intercollegiate college basketball during the 1980–81 NCAA Division I men's basketball season. The head coach was Pete Carril and the team co-captains were David Blatt and Randy Melville. The team played its home games in the Jadwin Gymnasium on the university campus in Princeton, New Jersey.  The team was the champion of the Ivy League, which earned them an invitation to the 48-team 1981 NCAA Men's Division I Basketball Tournament.

The team posted an 18–10 overall record and a 14–1 conference record.  The team's only conference loss came on February 24, 1981, against the Penn Quakers at The Palestra in Philadelphia, Pennsylvania, by a 52–43 margin.  The team won its March 10, 1981, one-game Ivy League playoff game against Penn at the Kirby Sports Center at Lafayette College in Easton, Pennsylvania, by a 54–40 margin for the Ivy League Championship and an invitation to the NCAA Men's Division I Basketball Tournament.  The team lost its March 12, 1981 NCAA Men's Division I Basketball Tournament East Regional first-round game against the BYU Cougars 60–51 at the Providence Civic Center in Providence, Rhode Island.

The team was led by first team All-Ivy League selection Melville. Steurer and Melville continue to share the Princeton single game record. The team achieved a 54.9% field goal percentage in conference games, which is the current Ivy League single-season record.

References

Princeton Tigers men's basketball seasons
Princeton Tigers
Princeton
Princeton
Princeton